Aljona Sasova (born 11 February 1988) is an Estonian footballer who played as a midfielder for the Estonia women's national team.

Career
Sasova made her debut at club level at the age of 14 and went on to represent Estonia on 51 occasions, scoring one goal.

References

1988 births
Living people
Women's association football midfielders
Estonian women's footballers
Estonia women's international footballers
Footballers from Tallinn